{{DISPLAYTITLE:C14H16O10}}
The molecular formula C14H16O10 (molar mass: 344.27 g/mol, exact mass: 344.0743 u) may refer to:

 Anthocyanone A, a degradation product of malvidin found in wine
 Theogallin, a phenolic compound found in tea

Molecular formulas